This list shows the number of asylum seekers arriving by boat on Australian shores or within its territorial waters between 1976 and 2013, after which the figures were no longer released to the public. The statistics were retrieved from the Australian Department of Parliamentary Services research paper, Boat arrivals in Australia since 1976, p.22.

For arrivals since July 2013, see limited figures released since Operation Sovereign Borders.

See also
 Asylum in Australia
 Immigration detention in Australia
 Pacific Solution
 Operation Sovereign Borders

References

History of immigration to Australia
Australian society-related lists
Social history-related lists